Gabriel Figueroa Mateos (April 24, 1907 – April 27, 1997) was a Mexican cinematographer who is regarded as one of the greatest cinematographers of the Golden Age of Mexican cinema. He has worked in over 200 films, which cover a broad range of genres, and is best known for his technical dominance, his careful handling of framing and chiaroscuro, and affinity for the aesthetics of artists.

Early life and career
Born in 1907, Figueroa grew up in Mexico City, where he studied painting at the Academy of San Carlos, and violin at the National Conservatory. He was the grandson of the famous lawyer, journalist and liberal writer Juan A. Mateos and first cousin to Mexican president Adolfo Lopez Mateos. His mother died after giving birth to him and his father, unable to cope with the loss of his wife, left Gabriel and his brother Roberto to be cared for by their aunts. He then fled to Paris, where he eventually succumbed to alcohol and despair. When the family fortune ran dry, Figueroa "had to leave the Academy and go into the darkroom to make a living". He first started learning photography, which became his source of income, with Lalo Guerrero. He worked in a studio on Colonia Guerrero, where people would get their pictures taken with painted curtains in the background and under natural light. Towards the end of the 1920s, Figueroa went on to work with photographers Juan de la Peña and José Guadalupe Velasco, before establishing his own studio with his friend Gilberto Martínez Solares. In 1932, thanks to his friend
Gilberto, Figueroa met cinematographer Alex Phillips. Convinced by his talent, Phillips managed to start Figueroa's career in the movie industry as a still photographer for the film Revolución (1933), directed by Miguel Contreras Torres. Figueroa and Phillips would continue to work alongside each other on several other films. As a result of marked growth in the field of Mexican film production, in 1933 Figueroa was able to continue and develop his work as a still photographer on at least 9 films, some of them of enormous significance in the history of national cinema. Towards the end of June 1933, Figueroa made his debut as a cinematographer in several shots of the medium-length documentary El vuelo glorioso de Barberán y Collar (1933), directed by René Cardona. And, between October and November, he was one of the camera operators of the multiple sequences filmed for Viva Villa! (1934), directed by Jack Conway. On November 13, 1934, Figueroa would begin working on the film Tribu (La Raza indómita) (1935) with fellow collaborator Miguel Contreras Torres, who Figueroa had his first job as a still photographer in 1932. Tribu marked another milestone in Figueroa's career, as it was the first time he shared credit with his teacher Alex Phillips, in addition to his stillman work.

In 1935, Rico Pani, son of prominent politician Alberto J. Pani, approached Figueroa with a contract to work as a cinematographer for a newly founded production company. To consolidate his knowledge, he obtained from the magnate a scholarship to go study in Hollywood, seeing closely the work of Gregg Toland, then considered one of the best cinematographers in the world. As a student, he saw Toland work on the film Splendor (1935) and learned how to create foreboding shadows and render a melancholy ambiance. Upon arrival, Figueroa checked-in to the famous Roosevelt Hotel from where he called the only person he knew in the city, Charlie Kimball, editor of the movie Maria Elena (1936), of which Figueroa had worked as an illuminator and stillman in February 1935. The call was answered by Gerardo Hanson, producer of Maria Elena, who later took him out to a villa on Vine Street. Figueroa always considered Toland as his teacher. The following year, in 1936, Gabriel returned to Mexico and it was here that he began to produce his distinctive images. His first feature, Allá en el Rancho Grande (1936), which would become one of the most popular films in Mexico and Latin America and is considered to be the one that started the Golden Age of Mexican cinema, gained international recognition when it won a prize at the Venice Film Festival and broke box-office records.

He filmed 235 movies over 50 years, including Los Olvidados by Luis Buñuel, The Fugitive by John Ford,  Río Escondido by Emilio Fernández, and The Night of the Iguana by John Huston for which he was nominated for the Academy Award for Best Cinematography in 1964.

One of his main collaborators was Fernández, with whom he shot twenty films, some of which won prizes at the Venice Film Festival, the Cannes Film Festival, and the Berlin Film Festival. After collaborating with Fernández and Buñuel on their films with such actors as Dolores del Río, Pedro Armendáriz, María Félix, Jorge Negrete, Columba Domínguez, and Silvia Pinal. Gabriel Figueroa has come to be regarded as one of the most influential cinematographers of México.

Filmography

Cinematographer

Camera operator

Still photographer

Awards and nominations

Academy Awards

Golden Globe Awards

Ariel Awards

Film festivals

Exhibition
 2011: Rencontres d'Arles Festival, France.
 2013-2014:  Los Angeles County Museum of Art, Los Angeles.  Detailed retrospective of Figueroa's photography, cinematography, and progressive politics.
The Los Angeles County Museum of Art (LACMA) organized the retrospective exhibition titled "Under the Mexican Sky: Gabriel Figueroa—Art and Film." The exhibit, featuring Figueroa's work from the early 1930s to the early 1980s, included film clips, paintings, photographs, posters and documents both from Figueroa's archive and the Televisa Foundation collections. "Under the Mexican Sky" recognizes Figueroa's contribution to Mexico's Golden Age of Film, both technically, and stylistically. LACMA curators highlight the artist's works across genres that "…helped forge an evocative and enduring image of Mexico." The exhibit ran from September 22, 2013, through February 2, 2014 in the Art of the Americas Building, Level 1.

See also
Emmanuel Lubezki
Henner Hofmann
Alfonso Cuarón
Alejandro González Iñárritu
Guillermo del Toro
 Adolfo López Mateos
 Esperanza López Mateos
Rosalío Solano
Cinema of Mexico

References

Sources

External links
Gabriel Figueroa's Official website 
Gabriel Figueroa's Profile at the Monterrey Institute of Technology and Higher Education website 
Great Cinematographers - Gabriel Figueroa
La Visión del Mago Gabriel Figueroa 
Trayectora de Gabriel Figueroa 
LACMA and The Academy co-present a major U.S. exhibition highlighting the prolific career of Mexican cinematographer Gabriel Figueroa
Gabriel Figueroa: A Cinematographer’s Luminous Art
.
Histórico de nominados y ganadores al Ariel 

1907 births
1997 deaths
Ariel Award winners
Golden Age of Mexican cinema
Golden Ariel Award winners
Golden Globe Award winners
Mexican cinematographers
People from Mexico City
Movie stills photographers